Simon Kent is a sculptor.

Simon Kent may also refer to:

 Simon Kent (MP) (fl. 1421), alias Simon Porter, MP and mayor
 Simon Kent (playwright) (1907–1992), pseudonym of British playwright and novelist Max Catto

See also
 Simon Gipps-Kent (1958–1987), English theatre and film actor